Acacia juncifolia, commonly known as rush-leaf wattle, is a shrub or tree belonging to the genus Acacia and the subgenus Phyllodineae that is endemic to north eastern Australia.

Description
Like most species of Acacia it has phyllodes rather than true leaves. The evergreen, glabrous and rigid phyllodes have a linear shape and are straight to slightly curved. It blooms between June and November. Following flowering seed pods form, that are prominently raised over each of the seeds. The seeds are arranged longitudinally within the pods.

Taxonomy
The specific epithet is taken from the Latin words juncus meaning rush and folium meaning leaf in reference to the rush-like appearance of the phyllodes. A. juncifolia has a similar appearance to Acacia calamifolia.
Two subspecies are known:
 Acacia juncifolia subsp. juncifolia
 Acacia juncifolia subsp. serpentinicola

Distribution
It is usually a part of dry sclerophyll forest and woodland communities growing well in sandy soils. In New South Wales it is extends north from around Glenbrook and as far west as Gilgandra.

See also
 List of Acacia species

References

juncifolia
Flora of Queensland
Flora of New South Wales
Plants described in 1842
Taxa named by George Bentham